North Korea and the United States have no formal diplomatic relations. Sweden acts as the protecting power of United States interests in North Korea for consular matters.

Current office holders
President Joe Biden announced on May 21, 2021 that Sung Kim will serve as the U.S. special envoy for North Korea.

List of Special Representatives

List of Special Envoys
 Special Envoys for the Six-Party Talks

 Special Envoy on North Korean Human Rights Issues

Jay Lefkowitz was President George W. Bush's Special Envoy for Human Rights in North Korea.
Sung Kim served as the Special Representative for North Korea Policy from November 2014-September 2016 and as Special Envoy for the Six-Party Talks from 2008-2011.
Stephen W. Bosworth served as special envoy to North Korea from 2009 to 2011, under President Obama. He had previously been an ambassador to several countries, including to South Korea from 1997 to 2001.
Robert R. King served as Special Envoy on North Korean Human Rights Issues from November 2009 to January 2017.
Clifford Hart served as the Special Envoy for the Six-Party Talks October 2011-July 2013.
Glyn Davies served as the Special Representative for North Korea Policy from January 2012-November 2014.
 Joseph Y. Yun served as the Special Representative for North Korea Policy October 17, 2016 – March 2, 2018.
 Stephen Biegun was appointed by Secretary Mike Pompeo and served from 2018–2021.

See also
Division of Korea
Human rights in North Korea
Korean Americans in New York City
Korean War
North Korea–United States relations
Foreign relations of North Korea
List of ambassadors of the United States to South Korea

References

External links
 United States Department of State: North Korea
 United States Department of State Bilateral Relations Factsheet: North Korea

North Korea
North Korea–United States relations